The Women's 800m T12-13 had its first round held on September 8, beginning at 18:40 and Final was held on September 9 at 18:35.

Medalists

Results

References
Round 1 - Heat 1
Round 1 - Heat 2
Final A

Athletics at the 2008 Summer Paralympics
2008 in women's athletics